Robert Darcy, 3rd Earl of Holderness,  (24 November 168120 January 1721) was a British peer and politician.

Life
Darcy was the second (but eldest surviving) son of John Darcy, Lord Conyers, (himself the eldest son of Conyers Darcy, 2nd Earl of Holderness), and Bridget, daughter of Robert Sutton, 1st Baron Lexington. He was styled Lord Conyers when his father died in 1688 and later inherited his grandfather's earldom in 1692. He also inherited the titles of 10th Baron Darcy de Knayth and 7th Baron Conyers. In 1698 he matriculated fellow-commoner from King's College, Cambridge. In 1714, the Earl of Holderness, as he now was, was appointed Lord Lieutenant of the North Riding of Yorkshire, admitted to the Privy Council. In 1718, he was appointed First Lord of Trade. He was also a Lord of the Bedchamber from 1719 to his death.

On 26 May 1715, Holderness married Lady Frederica Schomberg (the eldest surviving daughter of the 3rd Duke of Schomberg) and they had two surviving children: Hon. Robert (1718–1778) and Lady Caroline (d. 1778, married the 4th Marquess of Lothian).

On Lord Holderness' death in 1721, his title passed to his only surviving son, Robert Darcy, and his wife later married the future 1st Earl FitzWalter.

References

1681 births
1721 deaths
17th-century English nobility
18th-century English nobility
Earls of Holderness
Lord-Lieutenants of the North Riding of Yorkshire
Members of the Privy Council of Great Britain
Alumni of King's College, Cambridge
Presidents of the Board of Trade
Barons Darcy de Knayth
Barons Conyers